Chester Alan "Gavin" Arthur III (March 21, 1901 – April 28, 1972) was an American astrologer and sexologist. He was the grandson of Chester A. Arthur, the twenty-first president of the United States. He received his early education from Columbia College and later joined the Philolexian Society. He left his college and participated in the Irish Republican Movement. During his time in Ireland, he began going by the name Gavin.

Arthur founded Dune Forum, a short-lived cultural magazine aimed to spread alternating religious and political ideologies. After his father's death, he inherited various official documents, including newspapers during the time of his grandfather's presidency and presidential memento. In the 1950s, due to financial instability, Arthur sold newspapers on the streets of San Francisco. In the 1960s, he published The Circle of Sex, where he claimed that he had developed sexual intimacy with Edward Carpenter. He also claimed that Carpenter had had sexual relations with American author Walt Whitman. Arthur died in 1972; he was the last living descendant of the Arthur family. Most of his papers and official documents were donated to the Library of Congress.

Early life and education 
Chester Alan Arthur III was born in Colorado Springs, Colorado, on March 21, 1901, to Chester Alan Arthur II and his wife, Myra Fithian Andrews. He was the grandson of Chester A. Arthur, twenty-first president of the United States. Arthur II was an indirect stakeholder in the Trinchera Estate, a  ranch which was one of the main source of income for his family. During the early 1920s, Arthur studied at Columbia College in New York; he was a member of the Class of 1924 and also of the Philolexian Society. Arthur was an admirer of the works of the British poet and activist Edward Carpenter.

Career

Early career 
After leaving college, Arthur worked in the Irish Republican Movement, living in New York, France, and Ireland. While in Europe, Arthur and his wife Charlotte had roles in the 1930 avant-garde film Borderline, which also starred H.D. and Paul Robeson. In the early 1930s, he moved to Pismo Beach, California, and began going by the name "Gavin",. Arthur founded an art and literature commune and published a short-lived magazine, Dune Forum,  with an intention to "express the creative thought of America looking not toward Europe but toward the West" and spread alternating religious and political ideologies. Amy Hart wrote that the magazine was a "platform where Dunites could express their varied worldviews and religious ideals". Dunites were group of artists and mystics who lived in Guadalupe-Nipomo Dunes from the 1930s till 1950s. Arthur, one of the most famous dunite, described the group as "intensely individualistic, with ideas as different one from another as any in the country" in the Dune Forum. The magazine was released in seven issues between 1933–1934.

In 1934, Arthur joined the Utopian Society of America. Upon his father's death in 1937, all of Arthur II's financial assets were distributed equally between his son Gavin and his wife. He inherited various receipts, bills, checkbooks, presidential mementos, newspaper clippings from his grandfather's presidency, and correspondence letters from politicians such as Ulysses S. Grant, James A. Garfield, Millard Fillmore, James G. Blaine, among others. He received typed copies of various important documents. Arthur served as secretary of the California Democratic Party in 1940, during the administration of Franklin D. Roosevelt, but resigned the following year, convinced that the party had betrayed his principles. During World War II, Arthur served in the United States Army and the Merchant navy.

After the war, Arthur moved to New York and undertook the writing of a family history, which was never completed. Returning to California in 1949, Arthur taught classes at San Quentin State Prison for many years. In 1952, he finished his bachelor's degree at San Francisco State College. Often low on funds, Arthur sold newspapers on the streets of San Francisco in the 1950s and 1960s. At the same time, he began to gain fame as an astrologer.

The Circle of Sex 
A sexologist by profession, Arthur published The Circle of Sex in 1962 that analyzed human sexuality through the lens of yin-yang polarities. Rather than the linear scale developed by Alfred Kinsey, Arthur envisioned sexuality as a wheel with twelve orientations, six for each sex. The twelve types corresponded to the 12-hours dial clock and Arthur illustrated each with a historical archetype, like Don Juan, Sappho, and Lady C. In 1966, he published an enlarged edition of the same title. In that edition, he claimed that on his first visit with Carpenter, they both developed a sexual intimacy. Carpenter later told him that he had been sexual with American author Walt Whitman as well. Arthur, bisexual himself, was said to have been intimate with Neal Cassady as well.

Astrology and later career 
Arthur was friend to many people of the Beat Generation, including Allen Ginsberg and Alan Watts. He was active in the early gay rights movement, and was also a leader of the Haight-Ashbury counterculture. Arthur used his astrology to decide the date for the first "Human Be-In" event on January 14, 1967. Over 30,000 people, including many Gypsies attended the event. During the presidency of John F. Kennedy, according to The New York Times, he helped the first lady Jacqueline Kennedy to "locate art objects stored and forgotten by previous Presidential occupants". Arthur believed he was in spiritual connections with local Chumash Indians. According to various of his friends, including F. Scott Fitzgerald, Ernest Hemingway, Eleanor Roosevelt, and Winston Churchill, Arthur would refer to himself as a "pre-hippie hippie".

Personal life and death 

Arthur was married three times in his life. In 1922, he married Charlotte Joy Johnson, divorcing her in 1932. Three years later, he wed Esther Murphy Strachey, whom he divorced in 1961. His final marriage, to Ellen Jansen, took place in 1965.

Arthur died on April 28, 1972, at the Fort Miley Veterans Hospital in San Francisco. He is buried at the Albany Rural Cemetery. Having no children of his own, he was the last living descendant of his grandfather, President Chester A. Arthur. His papers, including many family papers, were given to the Library of Congress soon after his death. Philip Avillo wrote that "Throughout his life, Arthur cultivated a wide variety of people, including political leaders, writers, entertainers, sexologists, and social misfits and outcasts."

References

Works cited 

 
 
 
 
 
 
 
 
 
 
 
 
 
 
 
 
 
 
 

1901 births
1972 deaths
American astrologers
20th-century astrologers
American expatriates in the Republic of Ireland
American LGBT military personnel
Bisexual military personnel
American magazine founders
United States Navy personnel of World War II
American newspaper people
American relationships and sexuality writers
American sexologists
Beat Generation people
Bisexual men
California Democrats
Arthur family
Educators from California
Educators from New York (state)
American LGBT businesspeople
LGBT people from California
LGBT people from Colorado
LGBT people from New York (state)
American LGBT rights activists
Military personnel from Colorado
People from Pismo Beach, California
San Francisco State University alumni
Writers from Colorado Springs, Colorado
Writers from San Francisco
Writers from New York City
Dunites
20th-century American non-fiction writers
Activists from California
20th-century American male writers
American male non-fiction writers
Columbia College (New York) alumni
20th-century pseudonymous writers
American bisexual writers